Shupria or Shubria was an Armenian kingdom, known from Assyrian sources from the 13th century BC onward, in the Armenian Highlands, to the south-west of Lake Van, bordering Urartu. The capital was Ubbumu. The name Shupria is often regarded as derived from, or even synonymous with, the earlier kingdom of Subartu (Sumerian: Shubur), mentioned in Mesopotamian records as early as the 3rd millennium BC. However, the Sumerians appear to have  used the name Subartu to describe an area corresponding to Upper Mesopotamia and/or Assyria.

Ernst Weidner interpreted textual evidence to indicate that after a Hurrian king, Shattuara of Mitanni, was defeated by Adad-nirari I of the Middle Assyrian Empire in the early 13th century BC, he became ruler of a reduced vassal state, Shupria or Subartu. 

Regardless, the region fell under Urartian rule in the 9th century BC. Their descendants, according to most scholars, contributed to the ethnogenesis of the Armenians. Some scholars have linked a district in the area, Arme or Armani, to the name Armenia. Medieval Islamic scholars, relying on ancient sources, claimed that the people of Subar (Subartu or Shupria) and the Armani (Armenians) had shared ancestry. These scholars include the 17th century Ottoman traveller and historian Evliya Çelebi (Derviş Mehmed Zillî) in his most important work "Seyāḥat-nāme"(Book IV, Chapter 41). 

In the early 7th century BC, Shupria was mentioned in the letter of the Assyrian King Esarhaddon to the god Assur. Esarhaddon undertook an expedition against Shupria in 674, subjugating it.

At least one king of Shupria, Anhitte, was mentioned by Shalmaneser III.

The term Arme-Shupria 

Shubria is not attested in Urartian texts. For this reason, Melikishvili hypothesized that the Urartian term Urme denoted Shupria or overlapped with it geographically. Diakonov disagreed to this and coined the term Arme-Shupria (also Urme-Shupria ) to denote a broader region in the sources of Tigris and Mush plain.
This term was mostly used in post-Soviet countries and it is virtually absent in Western literature. It is also absent both in Assyrian and Urartian corpus. Given that the royal city of Arme was Nihiria while the royal cities of Shubria were Kullimeri and Ubbumu, it is very unlikely that they were the same polity. In most likelihood they were different, but neighboring, polities.

See also 
Armani (kingdom)
Bronze Age collapse
Proto-Armenian language
Indo-European languages

References 

Western Armenia
Urartu